Jeff S. Klotz (* 1990 in Pforzheim, full name Jeff Stephan Klotz von Eckartsberg) is a German  Author, publisher, museum director and entrpreneur. He lives in Schloss Bauschlott  (municipality of Neulingen) where he runs the J. S. Klotz Verlagshaus (publishing company). From 2009 to 2019 he was active in local politics in Remchingen.
Jeff Klotz is above all active in various areas of the Protestant Church and welfare and social work, and runs the Protestant Academy Schloss Bauschlott. Since 2020 he has been a member of the State Synod of the Evangelischen Landeskirche in Baden and since 2021 also a member of the Synode der Evangelical Church in Germany (EKD).

Life and Work 
Jeff Klotz grew up in Remchingen and Kopenhagen and studied history, Classical Archeology and Ancient and Early History at Heidelberg University.

Since 2008 he has been jointly responsible for setting up the Roemermuseum (Roman museum)  Remchingen which he has run on a voluntary basis since 2009. Since 2011 he has developed the museum to specialise in religious history. In addition, he has since 2013 organised the association  Kultur- und Museumslandschaft Nordschwarzwald (culture and museum sector of the northern Black Forest area) and since 2015 has been curator of Pforzheim Archeological Museum.

He is director of J. S. Klotz Publishing in Schloss Bauschlott in Neulingen and the market place in Karlsruhe, and also the Historical Museum Schloss Bauschlott in Bauschlott and the Cafe in Schloss Bauschlott.  A further focus is his work in cultural areas in schools. As an example, in the frame of a cooperation with Lessing-Gymnasium Karlsruhe he organised events and excursions for the pupils with archeological and historical themes. Klotz runs a culture centre in Pforzheim in the Villa Wagner, one of the best preserved art nouveau buildings in Baden-Wuerttemberg.

In 2016 he received the archeological promotion award of the state of Baden-Württemberg. The main focus of his research lies in building research, architectural and church history.

He is a member of the church district council and of the area synod of the Enz area, the state synod of the reformatic church in Baden and the synod of the Reformatic Church in Germany (EKD). In addition, he founded in 2021 the Baden-Wuertemberg Scientific Society and is planning the establishment of the Culture Foundation of Baden-Wuertemberg

Klotz collection 
Jeff S. Klotz is an active art collector. His collection of around 300 works centres on the 19th century and the first half of the 20th century and forms the basis of the Schloss Bauschlott Art Museum. His collection began in 2008 with a drawing by Theodor Verhas, and it now contains works by Wilhelm Leibl, Franz von Lenbach, Auguste Rodin, Louis Gurlitt, Otto Dix and other artists. Also included are large numbers of works by K. R. H. Sonderborg, Ivo Hauptmann und Carlos Grethe. He also manages the estate of the artist couple Vera and Bert Joho for the Reinshagen family.

Publications (selection) 
 With Marlis Zeus: Die ersten Christen im Nordschwarzwald.(The First Christians in the Northern Black Forest) Arte Factum, Karlsruhe 2014, ISBN 978-3-938560-33-4.
 Die Römer in Remchingen. Funde und Befunde des 1. bis 3. Jahrhunderts in Remchingen und Umgebung.  (The Romans in Remchingen. Discoveries and Findings from the 1st to 3rd centuries AD in Remchingen and the surrounding area) Verlag J. S. Klotz, Remchingen 2015, ISBN 978-3-946231-01-1.
 with Marlis Zeus: Frauen im Aufbruch 1910–1920. Kaiserreich – Weltkrieg – Republik. (The awakening (emancipation?) of Women 1910–1920. German Empire - World War - Republic) Verlag J. S. Klotz, Remchingen 2015, ISBN 978-3-946231-02-8.
 Die Römer in Pforzheim und im Enzkreis. Einblicke in die provinzialrömische Kultur im Pforzheimer Raum. (The Romans in Pforzheim and in the Enz area. An insight in the culture of Roman provinces in the Pforzheim area) Verlag J. S. Klotz, Remchingen 2015, ISBN 978-3-946231-00-4.
 as co-author: Religion im Wandel. Vorgeschichte – Römer – Mittelalter. Religionsgeschichte am Oberrhein. (Changes in Religion. Prehistory – Romans – Middle Ages. History of Religion in the Upper Rhine Area)  Verlag J. S. Klotz, Remchingen 2016, ISBN 978-3-946231-05-9.
 with Ewald Freiburger: Kirchen und Klöster im Nordschwarzwald. Ein Überblick zur Kirchengeschichte im Raum Karlsruhe und Pforzheim. (Churches and Monasteries in the Northern Black Forest. An Overview of Church History in the Karlsruhe and Pforzhein Area) Verlag J. S. Klotz, Remchingen 2017, ISBN 978-3-946231-06-6.
 Schloss Bauschlott. Die Geschichte eines markgräflichen Hausgutes. (Bauschlott Castle. The Story of a Margrave Estate) Verlag J. S. Klotz, Remchingen 2018.
 Schlösser und Burgen in Karlsruhe, Pforzheim, im Kraichgau und im Nordschwarzwald. (Castles and Forts in Karlsruhe, Pforzheim, Kraichgau and the Northern Black Forest) Verlag J. S. Klotz, Remchingen 2018, ISBN 978-3-946231-15-8.
 with Marlis Zeus: Frauen im Aufbruch. Der lange Weg zum modernen Frauenwahlrecht.  (Women's Emancipation: The Long Path to today's voting rights for women) Verlag J. S. Klotz, Remchingen 2018.
 with Carolin Dieckmann: Das Schloss Pforzheim und die Schlosskirche. (Pforzheim Castle and the Castle Church) Verlag J. S. Klotz, Remchingen 2018, ISBN 978-3-946231-09-7.
 Pforzheim. Ein Stadtführer. (Pforzheim. A city guide) Verlag J. S. Klotz, Remchingen 2019, ISBN 978-3-948424-16-9.
 Die Kirchenburgen von Ellmendingen und Dietlingen. (The Fortified Churches of Ellmendingen and Dietlingen) Verlag J. S. Klotz, Remchingen 2019, ISBN 978-3-946231-21-9.
 with Holger Müller: Die Evangelische Kirche Staffort. Ein paradiesisches Gesamtkunstwerk aus Neogotik und Jugendstil. (The Reformatic Church in Staffort. A Heavenly Synthesis of Building Art) Verlag J. S. Klotz, Neulingen 2019, ISBN 978-3-948424-04-6.
 Mythos Jerusalem. Der Oberrhein und das Heilige Land, (Mythical Jerusalem. The Upper Rhine and the Holy Land) Neulingen 2018, ISBN 978-3-946231-11-0
 with Markus Mall: Die evangelische Stephanuskirche in Kieselbronn, (The Reformatic Stephen's Church in Kieselbronn) J.S. Klotz Verlagshaus, Bauschlott 2020, ISBN 978-3948424701.
 with Mathias Kraft: Die Evangelische Michaelskirche Gräfenhausen, (The Reformatic Michael Church in Graefenhausen) J.S. Klotz Verlagshaus, Bauschlott 2020, ISBN 978-3-948424-89-3

Honours 
 Archeological Promotion Award 2016 of the State of

External links 
 Jeff Klotz Museumsleiter Remchingen
 Indexeintrag bei Deutsche-Biographie.de

References 

Living people
People from Pforzheim
1990 births
21st-century German historians
German art collectors